Alternative natural materials are natural materials like rock or adobe that are not as commonly in use as materials such as wood or iron.  Alternative natural materials have many practical uses in areas such as sustainable architecture and engineering. The main purpose of using such materials is to minimize the negative effects that our built environment can have on the planet while increasing the efficiency and adaptability of the structures.

History 

Alternative natural materials have existed for quite some time but often in very basic forms or only as ingredients to a particular material in the past. For example, earth used as a building material for walls of houses has existed for thousands of years. Much more recently, in the 1920s, the United States government promoted rammed earth as a fireproof construction method for building farmhouses. Another more common example is adobe. Adobe homes are prominent in the southwestern U.S. and several Spanish-speaking countries.

Straw bale construction is a more modern concept, but there even exists evidence that straw was used to make homes in African prairies as far back as the Paleolithic times.
Alternative natural materials, specifically their applications, have only recently made their way into more common use. The ideas of being both green and sustainable in response to global warming and climate change shifted more of a focus onto the materials and methods used to build our cityscape and homes. As environmentally conscious decisions became commonplace, the use of alternative natural materials instead of typical natural materials or man-made materials that rely heavily on natural resources became prominent.

Materials

Rock 
Rock is a great alternative to conventional materials which contain chemicals that may be harmful to people, pets or the environment. Rocks have two great characteristics: good thermal mass and thermal insulation. These characteristics make stone a great idea because the temperature in the house stays rather constant thus requiring less air conditioning and other cooling systems. Types of rocks that can be employed are reject stone (pieces of stone that are not able to be used for another task), limestone, and flagstone.

Straw 
Straw bales can be used as a basis for walls instead of drywall. Straw provides excellent insulation and fire resistance in a traditional post-and-beam structure, where a wood frame supports the house. These straw walls are about 75% more energy efficient than standard drywalls and because no oxygen can get through the walls, fire cannot spread and there is no chance of combustion.

Bamboo 
In Asian countries, bamboo is being used for structures like bridges and homes. Bamboo is surprisingly strong and rather flexible and grows incredibly fast, making it a rather abundant material. Although it can be difficult to join corners together, bamboo is immensely strong and makes up for the hardships that can be encountered while building it.

Cordwood 
Cordwood is a combination of small remnants of firewood and other lumber that usually go to waste. These small blocks of wood can easily be put together to make a structure that, like stone, has great insulation as well as thermal mass. Cordwood provides the rustic look of log cabins without the use of tons of lumber. You can build an entire building with just cordwood or use stones to fill in the walls.

Rammed earth 
Rammed earth is a very abundant material that can be used in place of concrete and brick. Soil is packed tightly into wall molds where it is rammed together and hardened to form a durable wall packing made of nothing more than dirt, stones, and sticks. Rammed Earth also provides great thermal mass, which means great energy savings. In addition, it is very weatherproof and durable enough that it was used in the Great Wall of China.

Earth-sheltered 
Earth sheltering is a unique building technique in which buildings are completely constructed on at least one side by some form of Earth whether it be a grass roof, clay walls, or both. This unique system usually includes plenty of windows because of the difficulty involved with using too much electricity in such a house. This adds to the energy efficiency of the house by reducing lighting costs.

Papercrete 
Papercrete is an interesting and very new material that is a good substitute for concrete. Papercrete is shredded paper, sand, and cement mixed together that forms a very durable brick-like material. Buildings utilizing papercrete are very well-insulated as well as being termite- and fire-resistant. Papercrete is very cheap as it usually only costs about $0.35 per square foot.

Adobe 
Adobe is an age-old technique that is cheap, easy to obtain, and ideal for hot environments. A mixture of sand, clay, and water is poured into a mold and left in the sun to dry. When dried, it is exceptionally strong and heat-resistant. Adobe does not let much heat through to the inside of the structure, thus providing excellent insulation during the summer to reduce energy costs. Although this clay mixture provides excellent insulation from heat, it is not very waterproof and can be dangerous in earth-quake prone areas due to its tendency to crack easily.

Sawdust 
Sawdust is a good material to combine with clay or cement mixtures and use for walls. These walls turn out surprisingly sturdy and effectively recycle any trees that may need to be excavated from the building area. Depending what type of sawdust used (hardwood is best) the wood chips in the walls absorb moisture and help prevent cracking during freeze/thaw cycles. Sawdust may be combined with water and frozen to produce a material commonly known as pykrete, which is strong, and less prone to melting than regular ice.

Examples 

Although this is a newer technology there are some buildings that have already employed these materials, as well as other tactics, to make themselves green.
One such building design is the proposed Dubiotech headquarters in Dubai in the United Arab Emirates. This design calls for solar panels and windows, which would let plenty of natural light in while also getting maximum use out of the sunlight. This building (under delayed construction since the 2008 financial crisis would also be built with an alternative kind of steel that is not made by a process that releases tons of harsh chemicals into the atmosphere.
Another example is the School of Art, Media, and Design located in Singapore. This school has a roof made completely of grass (an example of Earth-sheltering). This allows the use of less concrete and other materials for the roof, and the building also includes much window to utilize natural lighting.

See also 
Natural materials
Green building
Sustainable architecture
Sustainable landscaping
Sustainable landscape architecture
Sustainable gardening

References 

Natural
Sustainable architecture